O'Devlin  is the surname of a Gaelic Irish family of the Uí Néill who were chiefs in the far northeastern of the present-day County of Tyrone, bordering on Lough Neagh and the Ballinderry River. The O'Develins claimed a common descent from Develin (in Irish: Dobhuilen or "Raging Valour", an Irish noble of the royal blood of Aileach who flourished in or about the eighth century AD and was eighth in descent from Owen, the founder of the clan). Develin was a scion of that branch of the clan Owen known as the Sons of Erca (Cenel Mic Erca) because of their descent from Muirchertach Mac Erca, grandson of Owen.

Origins variants
(Anglicized form of Irish Ó Dobhailéin 'descendant of Dobhailéan') A personal name probably from a diminutive of dobhail "unlucky" or "unfortunate".

Alternative spellings of the name are Develon, Develin, Devolin, Devlin, Deveyn, Devellen, Dobhilen, Dobhailen, Dobhailean, Dobhalen, Doibhilen, Doibhelen, Doibhilein, Dhoibhilein, Dubhalen, Doibhlin, Dubhlein, Dubhlein, Dubhlin, Dubhlen, Dublein, Duiblein, DeVilling, and Devilling.

History
After the Battle of Downpatrick, MacNamee, hereditary poet O'Neill,, composed a poem called The Lament for O'Neill, in which he bewails the death of his king and the numerous nobles of his race who were slain with him. Among the nobles was O'Develin, of whom the poet sings:
 "Alas! Deep grief overspread the country To anticipate the death of O'Develin Gofraidh our grief unto Judgement Day Generous of his banquet was his youth"
 Adam Devlin (born 1969), English guitarist and songwriter
 Alex Devlin (born 1949), Canadian basketball player
 Anne Devlin (1780–1851), Irish housekeeper to Robert Emmett; cousin of Michael Dwyer and Arthur Devlin
 Anne Devlin (writer) (contemporary), Northern Irish writer
 Art Devlin (baseball) (1879–1948), American professional baseball player
 Ben Devlin (contemporary), British television executive producer
 Bernadette Devlin McAliskey (born 1947), Northern Ireland Republican political activist MP from Mid Ulster
 Bernard Devlin (September 2, 1923 – 1983), Canadian film producer, script writer and director
 Bernie Devlin, American psychiatrist
 Bruce Devlin (born 1937), Australian professional golfer, sportscaster, and golf course designer
 Chris Thomas Devlin, American screenwriter
 Chris Devlin-Young (born 1961), American paralytic ski racer
 Daniel Devlin (1814 – February 22, 1867), a prosperous businessman, city chamberlain, and prominent citizen of New York City
 Dean Devlin (born 1962), American screenwriter and producer
 Denis Devlin (1908–1959), Irish modernist poet and diplomat
 Desmond Devlin (contemporary), American comedy writer
 Ernie Devlin (1920-1976), English footballer
 Es Devlin  (born 1971), English stage designer
 Fay Devlin (contemporary), Irish Gaelic footballer
 Harry Devlin (contemporary) (born 1918), American artist and cartoonist
 J. G. Devlin (1907–1991), Northern Irish actor from Belfast
 James Devlin (born 1989), British rapper who goes by Devlin
 Janet Devlin (born 1994), Northern Irish singer, finalist on The X Factor (UK series 8)
 Jim Devlin (1849–1883), American professional baseball player
 John H. Devlin Irish musician
 Joseph Devlin (1872–1934), Northern Ireland Nationalist politician, MP from Belfast
 Keith Devlin (contemporary), English mathematician and writer
 Larry Devlin (contemporary), American former CIA officer
 Leah McCall Devlin (born 1954), American health educator and dentist
 Mark D. Devlin (1948–2005), American author
 Matt Devlin (Irish republican) (contemporary), Irish member of the IRA and Sinn Féin
 Matt Devlin (sportscaster) (contemporary), American sportscaster
 Michael Devlin (musician) (born 1942), American opera bass-baritone
 Michael J. Devlin (born 1965), pleaded guilty to kidnapping two children in Missouri, USA
 Mike Devlin (entrepreneur) (contemporary), co-founder and CEO of Rational Software Corporation
 Mike Devlin (athlete) (born 1969), American professional football player
 Nicky Devlin (born 1993), Scottish professional football player
 Paddy Devlin (1925–1999), Northern Ireland MP from Stormont
 Patrick Devlin, Baron Devlin (1905–1992), British judge
 Paul Devlin (filmmaker) (contemporary), sports editor and documentary filmmaker
 Paul Devlin (footballer) (born 1972), professional football player (Sheffield United, Birmingham City, Watford, Scotland)
 Stuart Devlin (born 1931), British coin engraver
 Susan Devlin (born 1931), Irish-American badminton player
 Susan J. Devlin, American statistician
 Tim Devlin (born 1959), British politician, MP from Stockton South
 William Devlin, various people

Fictional characters
Burke Devlin, character on Dark Shadows
 Clare Devlin, one of the main characters on Derry Girls
 Clark Devlin, a primary character in the movie The Tuxedo
 Ernie Devlin, the title character from the 1974 Hanna-Barbera cartoon series Devlin
 Jack Devlin, character in the movie The Net
 Jack Devlin, character in the 1998 John Woo movie Blackjack
 Governor James Devlin, character in the HBO drama Oz
 Liam Devlin, an IRA agent cooperating with the Germans in the Jack Higgins novel The Eagle Has Landed (played in the 1976 movie by Donald Sutherland)
 Duke Devlin, the English version of the character Ryuki Otogi, from the Yu-Gi-Oh! anime
 Devlin Agamand, a character in the video game World Of Warcraft
 Matt Devlin, a character from Law & Order: UK
 Max Devlin, character in the movie Paradox
 Max Devlin, the shady landlord who makes a deal with the Devil to try to convince three other people to sell their souls to take his place in Hell in The Devil and Max Devlin, played by Elliott Gould
 Sean Devlin, the protagonist of the game The Saboteur
 Suzanne Devlin, character in the Sweet Valley High book series
 T.R. Devlin, American government agent portrayed by Cary Grant in Notorious

References

 Surnames of the United Kingdom, Henry Harrison 1826
 Gena-logical History of the Milesian Families of Ireland  D.W. De Courcy
 Genealogical History of the Irish Families John Rooney
 Devlins history of his people,.JB Devlin
 Index to the Prerogative Wills of Ireland (1536-1810)
 Calendar of the State Papers,Ireland May 8, 1647
 The Story of an Irish Sept Professor Joseph Chubb Develin D.Litt.
 The Annuals of Ulster 1103

Irish families
Surnames
Surnames of Irish origin
English-language surnames